Leipsic is a former English and very rare former French spelling for the German city of Leipzig.

Leipsic may also refer to:

Places in the United States
 Leipsic, Delaware
 Leipsic, Indiana
 Leipsic, Ohio
 West Leipsic, Ohio
 Leipsic River, Delaware

People
Brendan Leipsic (born 1994), Canadian ice hockey player

See also
Leipzig (disambiguation)